A number of national supreme courts style themselves "Supreme Tribunals of Justice":

Supreme Tribunal of Justice (Bolivia) (Tribunal Supremo de Justicia)
Superior Court of Justice (Brazil) (Superior Tribunal de Justiça)
Supreme Court of Justice (Portugal) (Supremo Tribunal de Justiça)
Supreme Tribunal of Justice (Venezuela)
Supreme Tribunal of Justice of Venezuela in exile

See also
Tribunal Constitucional (disambiguation)
:Category:National supreme courts